Bo Sven Sune Bakke (born 3 May 1955 in Asker) is a Norwegian curler and world champion. He participated on the winning team in the demonstration event at the 1988 Winter Olympics.

International championships
Bakke is two times world champion, and has obtained one silver medal at the European Curling Championships.

References

External links

Living people
1955 births
Norwegian male curlers
World curling champions
Curlers at the 1988 Winter Olympics
Olympic curlers of Norway
Norwegian curling champions
20th-century Norwegian people